Mara Lapia is an Italian politician. She was elected to be a deputy to the Parliament of Italy in the 2018 Italian general election for the Legislature XVIII of Italy.

Career
Lapia was born on August 22, 1976 in Nuoro. She is a lawyer, and has a degree in criminology.

She was elected to the Italian Parliament in the 2018 Italian general election, to represent the district of Sardinia for the Five Star Movement.

References

Living people
21st-century Italian women politicians
Five Star Movement politicians
1976 births
People from Nuoro
Sardinian women